Andrei Ryabov may refer to:

 Andrey Ryabov (born 1969), Russian footballer
 Andrei Ryabov (musician) (born 1962), Russian-born jazz guitarist